Margrethe of Roskilde, also called Margrethe of Ølse (d. 1176), was a Danish Roman Catholic local saint. She has been referred to as the only female saint in Denmark.

Margrethe was related to Bishop Absalon of Roskilde, and married to Herlog in Ølsemagle in Kjøge. In 1176, she was murdered by her spouse, who hanged her corpse to make it appear as if she had committed suicide. As a suicide, she was buried outside of church blessing at the beach of Ølsemagle Strand.

When miracles appeared by her grave, Absalon conducted an investigation, which exposed the murder upon the confession of Herlog. Her remains were then reburied in the Roskilde cathedral. A chapel to her honor was erected upon the beach of her former grave, and Roskilde Abbey was founded nearby. Though never canonized by the Pope, she became venerated as a saint in Denmark. Reportedly, she was often called upon by women in childbirth.

Margrethe of Roskilde has been called the only female saint in Denmark. Though foreign female saints were venerated in Denmark, and there were in fact three female saints in Scania, which was at that time a Danish province (Magnhild of Fulltofta, Sissela of Borrby and Tora of Torekov), she was the only Danish born woman saint within the borders of present Denmark.

References

 Dansk biografisk Lexikon / XI. Bind. Maar - Müllner / 
  Dansk Kvindebiografisk Leksikon
 Nanna Damsholt: Kvindebilledet i dansk højmiddelalder, 1985. N. P. Nielsen: Bygden omkring Køge Aa, 1938. Hans Olrik (red.): Danske Helgeners Levned, 1893–94

12th-century Danish women
12th-century Danish people
1176 deaths
Danish Roman Catholic saints
12th-century Christian saints
Year of birth unknown
Christian female saints of the Middle Ages